Heinrich Karl Uhle (16 July 1887 in Leipzig – 12 October 1969 in Leipzig) was a German amateur footballer who played as a forward and competed in the 1912 Summer Olympics. He was a member of the German Olympic squad and played one match in the consolation tournament.

References

External links

1887 births
1969 deaths
German footballers
Germany international footballers
Olympic footballers of Germany
Footballers at the 1912 Summer Olympics
1. FC Lokomotive Leipzig players
German footballers needing infoboxes
Association football forwards
Footballers from Leipzig